Two referendums were held in Switzerland during 1946. The first was held on 10 February on a federal resolution on a petition on cargo transportation, and was rejected by voters. The second was held on 8 December on a popular initiative on the "right to work", and was also rejected.

Background
The February referendum on cargo transportation was a mandatory referendum, whilst the December referendum was a popular initiative. Both required a double majority; a majority of the popular vote and majority of the cantons. The decision of each canton was based on the vote in that canton. Full cantons counted as one vote, whilst half cantons counted as half.

Results

February referendum

December referendum

References

1946 referendums
1946 in Switzerland
Referendums in Switzerland